Roog is the supreme deity in the Serer religion.

Roog may also refer to:

"Roog" (story), a short story by Philip K. Dick
John Roog, an original guitarist and former member of the band Thompson Twins

See also
Rog (disambiguation)